The Australian Sprintcar Grand Prix is an annual dirt track racing meeting held in Australia for Sprintcars. The meeting is traditionally held at the Sydney Speedway (formerly the Parramatta City Raceway) and was first staged in the 1978/79 season.

The first Australian Sprintcar Grand Prix was held in 1978/79 and was won by Sydney-based driver Garry Rush.

The race is currently known as the Valvoline Australian Sprintcar Grand Prix due to sponsorship from oil company Valvoline.

The current champion is California sprint car driver Brad Sweet.  The reigning World of Outlaws champion has won the event three times, most recently on 26 December 2019.

Winners since 1978/79

See also
 Australian Sprintcar Championship
 Grand Annual Sprintcar Classic
 World Series Sprintcars

References

Sprintcar Grand Prix
Sprintcar
Sprint car racing